Hugo Meynell (June 1735 – 14 December 1808) was an English country landowner and politician who sat in the House of Commons between 1762 and 1780. He is generally seen as the father of modern fox hunting, became Master of Fox Hounds for the Quorn Hunt in Leicestershire in 1753 and continued in that role for another forty-seven years (the hunt is so called after Meynell's home, Quorn Hall in Quorndon, North Leicestershire).

Life

He was born the son of Littleton Pointz Meynell in June 1735.

Meynell pioneered an extended chase at high speeds through open grassland. Borrowing the pioneering breeding techniques of his neighbour, the sheep farmer Robert Bakewell, Meynell bred a new form of hound, with greater pace and stamina and a better sense of scent.

In 1762 Meynell was elected as one of the two Members of Parliament for Lichfield, after filing an election petition challenging the election of John Levett of Wychnor, Staffordshire. Meynell took the seat of Levett, a Tory. But apparently the Levett family held no grudge, because successive generations of Levetts were included in the Meynell hunts and became close family friends.

He represented three constituencies as Member of Parliament in the House of Commons between 1762 and 1780 (Lichfield 1762-1768, Lymington 1769-1774 and Stafford 1774-178) and served as High Sheriff of Derbyshire in 1758-1759.

He died in 1808, having married twice. He was succeeded as occupant of Quorn Hall and Master of the Quorn Hunt by his son Hugo, who died two years later after a hunting fall.

References

Further reading
 Lewis Namier & John Brooke, The History of Parliament: The House of Commons 1754-1790 (London: HMSO, 1964)

External links
 
 The Quorn Hunt and its masters

1735 births
1808 deaths
People from Quorn, Leicestershire
English hunters
Masters of foxhounds in England
Members of the Parliament of Great Britain for Lichfield
Members of the Parliament of Great Britain for Lymington
Members of the Parliament of Great Britain for Stafford
British MPs 1761–1768
British MPs 1768–1774
British MPs 1774–1780
High Sheriffs of Derbyshire